Idalus carinosa is a moth of the family Erebidae. It was described by William Schaus in 1905. It is found in French Guiana, Brazil, Venezuela and Bolivia.

References

 

carinosa
Moths described in 1905